"It's Beginning to Look a Lot Like Christmas" is a Christmas song written in 1951 by Meredith Willson. The song was originally titled "It's Beginning to Look Like Christmas". The song has been recorded by many artists, but was a hit for Perry Como and The Fontane Sisters with Mitchell Ayres & His Orchestra on September 18, 1951, and released on RCA Victor as 47-4314 (45 rpm) and 20-4314 (78 rpm). Bing Crosby recorded a version on October 1, 1951, which was also widely played.

History

Background and writing
A popular belief in Yarmouth, Nova Scotia, holds that Willson wrote the song while staying in Yarmouth's Grand Hotel. The song refers to a "tree in the Grand Hotel, one in the park as well..."; the park being Frost Park, directly across the road from the Grand Hotel, which still operates in a newer building on the same site as the old hotel.
It also makes mention of the five and ten which was a store operating in Yarmouth at the time.

It is also possible that the "Grand Hotel" Willson mentions in the song was inspired by the Historic Park Inn Hotel in his hometown of Mason City, Iowa. The Park Inn Hotel is the last remaining hotel in the world designed by architect Frank Lloyd Wright, and is situated in downtown Mason City overlooking central park.

In popular culture
Meredith Willson incorporated the song into his 1963 Broadway musical Here's Love, where it is sung in counterpoint to the newly composed song "Pine Cones and Holly Berries".

Johnny Mathis recorded the song for his 1986 album Christmas Eve with Johnny Mathis; this version gained popularity after its inclusion in the film Home Alone 2: Lost in New York. Gradually, Mathis's recording began to receive wide radio airplay, and for the past several years this version has been a Top 10 Christmas hit.

Perry Como version
Perry Como and The Fontane Sisters with Mitchell Ayres & His Orchestra released their cover of "It's Beginning to Look a Lot Like Christmas" on September 18, 1951, becoming one of the biggest versions of the song, which is still widely played today, with over 264 million streams on Spotify as of December 15, 2022.

Weekly charts

Certifications and sales

Michael Bublé version

Canadian singer Michael Bublé's version was first released on October 24, 2011, as the first track of Bublé's Christmas album. However, it was then released as the album's second single on November 18, 2012, achieving greater success. In the UK, the song peaked at number 6 in 2022.

Weekly charts

Year-end charts

Certifications and sales

Other notable versions

 1962: Alvin and the Chipmunks on their album Christmas with The Chipmunks
 2002: America on their album Holiday Harmony
 2007: The Four Freshmen on their album Snowfall
 2008: Harry Connick Jr. on his album What a Night! A Christmas Album
 2009: Connie Talbot on her album Connie Talbot's Holiday Magic
 2015: Jann Arden on her album A Jann Arden Christmas
 2016: Laura Pausini on her album Laura Xmas
 2017: Noah Cyrus on her promotional single
 2018: Pentatonix on their album Christmas Is Here!
 2020: Meghan Trainor on her album A Very Trainor Christmas
 2020: Quintino on the album Home Alone (On the Night Before Christmas) EP
 2021: Kelly Clarkson on her album When Christmas Comes Around...
 2022: V_(singer) (Kim Taehyung) from BTS, released on SoundCloud and the Youtube channel "BANGTANTV"

References

1951 songs
American Christmas songs
Andrea Bocelli songs
Bing Crosby songs
Johnny Mathis songs
Olivia Newton-John songs
Perry Como songs
Reprise Records singles
Richard Marx songs
Songs written by Meredith Willson